Saurabh Dubey may refer to:

 Saurabh Dubey (actor), Indian actor
 Saurabh Dubey (Uttar Pradesh cricketer) (born 1988), Indian cricketer
 Saurabh Dubey (Maharashtra cricketer) (born 1998), Indian cricketer